Bothrinia is a genus of butterflies in the family Lycaenidae. Known from southern China, India (Assam) and northern Thailand.

There are two species.
Bothrinia chennellii (de Nicéville, 1884)
Bothrinia nebulosa (Leech, 1890) China

References
"Bothrinia Chapman, 1909" at Markku Savela's Lepidoptera and some other life forms

Polyommatini
Lycaenidae genera
Taxa named by Thomas Algernon Chapman